The Chief Minister of Haryana is the chief executive of the Indian state of Haryana. As per the Constitution of India, the governor is a state's de jure head, but de facto executive authority rests with the chief minister. Following elections to the Haryana Legislative Assembly, the state's governor usually invites the party (or coalition) with a majority of seats to form the government. The governor appoints the chief minister, whose council of ministers are collectively responsible to the assembly. Given that he has the confidence of the assembly, the chief minister's term is for five years and is subject to no term limits. Since 1966, ten people have served as the Chief Minister of Haryana. The first was B. D. Sharma of the Indian National Congress party. Bhajan Lal Bishnoi is Haryana's longest-serving chief minister; he held office for 11 years 10 Months (4317 Days), Bansi Lal held office for 4268 Days. Devi Lal the fifth Chief Minister of Haryana, went on to twice serve as Deputy Prime Minister of India under prime ministers V. P. Singh and Chandra Shekhar. Om Prakash Chautala has served the most discontinuous stints as Chief Minister (four), as a member of three parties.

The incumbent chief minister is Manohar Lal Khattar, the first officeholder from the BJP, who was sworn in on 26 October 2014.

Chief Ministers of Haryana

Timeline

Notes
Footnotes

References

External links
 Government of Haryana, Official website

Haryana
 
Chief Ministers